CIRCOM (French: Cooperative Internationale de Recherche et d’Action en matière de Communication, English: International Cooperative for Research and Action on the Field of Communication) is a professional association of regional public service television stations in Europe.

Since 1990, the organisation awards the Prix CIRCOM Regional Programme Award at the CIRCOM Regional Annual Conference.

Member stations

References

External links 
 circom-regional.eu - Official web page

Pan-European trade and professional organizations
Television organizations
Trade associations based in France